__notoc__
The Post-Reformation Digital Library (PRDL) is a database of digitized books from the early modern era. The collected titles are directly linked to full-text versions of the works in question. The bibliography was initially inclined toward Protestant writers from the Reformation and immediate Post-Reformation era (the later sometimes characterized as the age of Protestant Scholasticism). In its current development the project is moving toward being a comprehensive database of early modern theology and philosophy and also includes late medieval and patristic works printed in the early modern period.

The database is a project of the Junius Institute for Digital Reformation Research at Calvin Theological Seminary, and was produced in cooperation with the H. Henry Meeter Center for Calvin Studies, a joint undertaking of Calvin College and Calvin Theological Seminary. 

As bibliographical projects such as VD 16, VD 17, and English Short Title Catalogue, have a more narrow national or regional focus, meta-bibliographical tools such as PRDL and Early Modern Thought Online play a vital role in facilitating scholarship in the rapidly changing technological landscape.

See also
 List of digital library projects
 Digital curation
 :Category:Digital libraries
 :Category:Geographic region-oriented digital libraries

References

Sources
 . 
 .
 .
 .
 .

External links
  of the Post-Reformation Digital Library

Early modern printing databases
Christian bibliographies
Bibliographic databases and indexes